Georgia Frances Elise Blain (12 December 19649 December 2016) was an Australian novelist, journalist and biographer.

Biography
Born in Sydney in 1964 to journalist and broadcaster Anne Deveson (d. 2016) and broadcaster Ellis Blain (d. 1978), Georgina Blain completed an arts degree at the University of Adelaide before returning to Sydney where she studied law at the University of Sydney. She worked as a journalist commencing work in 1990 as a lawyer with the Australian Copyright Council and wrote many articles for their Bulletin (ISSN 0311-2934).

Her first novel was Closed for Winter. One of her most recent works Births, Deaths and Marriages, a memoir of her childhood, was short-listed for the 2009 Nita Kibble Literary Award.

The draft of Closed for Winter 1996 earned her an Australian Society of Authors' mentorship with Rosie Scott. She later commented that without this relationship and guidance she may not have completed the novel.

When editing Between a Wolf and a Dog in 2015 Blain was diagnosed with brain cancer. A diagnosis which mirrored the story of Hilary, one of the main characters in the novel.

Novelist Charlotte Wood called Between a Wolf and a Doga novel of devastating clarity that traverses Blain's familiar terrain: the ordinary sadnesses in families, betrayal and forgiveness, the small, potent beauties of daily life that we allow to slip unnoticed through our fingers". In all her books Blain ruminates on families, siblings, loss, death, marriages and partnerships, in prose of stunning clarity and penetrating insight. Her writing is superbly paced and structured, and she has a gift for conjuring beaches, bush, and the suburbs of Sydney and Adelaide.She was, "... Acclaimed as a novelist, short story writer and essayist who transformed the everyday into works of extraordinary beauty and clarity."

Blain wrote a regular column for The Saturday Paper about her experiences with brain cancer.

She completed a draft of a final work before her death, a memoir entitled The Museum of Words, published by Scribe in 2017.

Bibliography

Novels
 
 Candelo  Penguin, 1999
 The Blind Eye  Penguin 2001
 Names for Nothingness  Picador, 2004
 Darkwater  Random House, 2010
 Too Close to Home  Random House, 2011
 Special  Random House, 2016
 Between a Wolf and a Dog  Scribe, 2016

Short fiction 
Collections

Non-fiction
 
 Births Deaths Marriages  Vintage, 2008

 The Museum of Words  Scribe, 2017

Critical studies and reviews of Blain's work
The secret lives of men

Filmography 
 Closed for Winter (2009) adapted by Georgia Blain and James Bogle

Awards

Closed for Winter 

1999 named as one of the Sydney Morning Herald's Best Young Novelists

Births Deaths Marriage 

2009 Shortlisted for the Nita B. Kibble Literary Award

Darkwater 
2012 Shortlisted Adelaide Festival Awards for Literature Young Adult

The Secret Lives of Men 
2014 Shortlisted Christina Stead Prize for Fiction NSW Premier's Literary Awards

2014 Longlisted for the Nita B. Kibble Literary Award

Between a Wolf and a Dog 
2016 Winner The University of Queensland Fiction Book Award (Queensland Literary Award)

2017 Winner Victorian Premier's Literary Awards.

2017 Shortlisted ALS Gold Medal.

2017 Longlisted Australian Book Industry Awards

Personal life
Born in Sydney in 1964 to journalist and broadcaster Anne Deveson and broadcaster Ellis Blain. She had two brothers, Jonathan (was diagnosed with schizophrenia and died by suicide) and Joshua. Her childhood was spent in various cities and the family moved to Sydney, Tuscany and Adelaide, where she completed a Bachelor of Arts at the University of Adelaide.

In 1998 she and her partner Andrew Taylor welcomed daughter Odessa.

Her writing was influenced by the difficult relationship of her mother and the children with father Ellis Blain. "His presence alone created tension; it was the threat of what he might do that kept us tiptoeing, scared, around him, ... Blain had long terrorised the home he shared with one of the country's best-known feminists with the threat and practice of physical violence ".

Georgia Blain died on 9 December 2016 from brain cancer which had been diagnosed in November 2015. Her mother, Anne Deveson, died three days later on 12 December.

References

1964 births
2016 deaths
20th-century Australian novelists
20th-century Australian women writers
21st-century Australian novelists
21st-century Australian women writers
Australian Book Review people
Australian journalists
Australian memoirists
Australian women novelists
Deaths from brain cancer in Australia
Granta people
Writers from Sydney
Place of death missing
Australian women memoirists